Sanjeev Uprety is a writer and professor at Tribhuvan University. He has written multiple books such as  Ghanchakkar, Siddhantaka Kura, Hansa.

Works

Novel 

 Ghanchakkar (2007)
 Hansa (2019)

Play 

 Makaiko Arkai Kheti

Non-fiction 

 Siddhanta ka Kura (2011)

References

Living people
Nepalese journalists
Year of birth missing (living people)
Nepalese writers
21st-century Nepalese writers
Padmashree Sahitya Puraskar winners
Nepalese male writers
Brown University alumni